The Crosman 2100B (Crosman 2100 Classic) is an American-made pneumatic air gun that is manufactured for small game hunting, large and small pest control, and target shooting.

Design overview
The 2100 Classic is manufactured with adjustable iron sights, but the 2100 Classic also has a dovetail rail for fitting a scope onto the gun. The materials are very basic:

Barrel: Rifled Steel

Stock: Synthetic

Forearm: Synthetic

Muzzle velocity:
 pellet: 725 fps
 BB: 755 fps

Also, for loading the magazine, there is a 17-shot magazine and a 200-round-capacity reservoir in the stock for BBs.  Pellets are single shot only.

Operation
Like most air rifles, the 2100 has only one safety, located behind the trigger, but the 2100 also comes with a plastic trigger block to put behind the trigger when not in use, and is only operated by an included special key. To put the gun into a fire-ready mode, the operator must work the action fully open, whether or not a round will be fired, and then close the action fully. Before or after working the action, the operator has to work the air pump at least once to shoot the round, but like most multi-stroke pneumatic air rifles, three pumps is usually the minimum for firing a powerful round, depending on the distance the round is being fired. And most importantly, the safety must be OFF to fire.

Loading
In order to load the 2100, the Repeater Magazine spring must be pulled back and locked into its notch to keep it in place, and then, after loading the BB reservoir, shaking the rifle up and down or in a twisting motion until the magazine is fully loaded, and then snapping the magazine spring back into the normal position. Then, when the action is worked, the magnetic bolt automatically loads a round into the chamber. Working the action multiple times will put more ammunition into the barrel, but they will roll out of it because only the first round is magnetically held in place.

Legality
Even though most American States do not regard BB guns as firearms, some states' definition of firearms (i.e. Michigan) is misleading. Though they may consider .177 caliber spring, gas, or air BB guns not to be firearms, the usual definition is only limited to smooth-bore BB guns, so one should be careful handling BB guns openly as many airguns look very similar to actual weapons and can be mistaken as such by the police.

See also
Crosman
Crosman Nightstalker

References
Product Page
Crosman Online Store Page

External links

Manual
 Complete Model 2100 Classic Owner's Manual

Images
 Full Left-Side View
 Thumbnail

Air guns of the United States